JDRF is a nonprofit 501(c)(3) organization that funds type 1 diabetes (T1D) research, provides a broad array of community and activist services to the T1D population and actively advocates for regulation favorable to medical research and approval of new and improved treatment modalities.  It was initially founded as the JDF, the Juvenile Diabetes Foundation. It later changed its name to the Juvenile Diabetes Research Foundation and is now known as JDRF.

History
JDRF was founded to find a cure for juvenile diabetes; in the 2000s, it broadened its research efforts to include ways to better manage the disease and ways to prevent it.

In 2005 the board of JDRF committed to supporting work on medical devices to manage blood glucose, known as artificial pancreas technology. The Board was urged to do so by Jeffrey Brewer, who founded and sold Citysearch, and had become interested in juvenile diabetes and medical devices after his son was diagnosed with the condition. The focus was on integrating continuous glucose monitors (CGM's) and insulin pumps via a computerized program that would use blood glucose levels obtained through the CGM to calculate an insulin dosage to be dispensed through the insulin pump. The first such device was approved in 2016.

JDRF has advocated for stem cell research; in a 2004 article in The Wall Street Journal, the authors observed that the JDRF "... has become adept at unleashing an army of hard-to-resist lobbyists – made up of determined parents and their afflicted children – on researchers, politicians and potential donors."

In 2011, the FDA had made it a priority to clarify the requirements for approval for such a closed-loop monitoring and drug delivery device for T1D, and announced it was preparing draft guidelines. JDRF launched a campaign to influence those guidelines to be lenient.  After the first closed loop device was approved in 2016, JDRF lobbied insurance companies to cover it. The campaign also put resources into educating people with diabetes on how to navigate health insurance in the United States, and into lobbying Congress to continue funding diabetes research through the NIH.

The FDA lobbying campaign was part of a gradual realignment of the organization to focus on issues other than helping find a cure for JD, but to help treat and manage the disease. This broadened scope meant that the organization increasingly directed its funds to education and advocacy, along with research funding. This included lobbying insurance companies to pay for CGM devices, educating patients on how to advocate for themselves, and lobbying Congress for more NIH funding.

In 1974, four years after JDRF was founded in the United States, a group of parents determined to find a cure for their children living with type 1 diabetes (T1D) came together and began JDRF Canada, launching the largest funder and advocate for T1D research in Canada. The UK arm of the Juvenile Diabetes Foundation (JDRF) was founded by Richard Lawson in 1986. In 1988 he became Director. The Foundation is now known as the Juvenile Diabetes Research Foundation (JDRF) and is "the leading global organisation funding Type 1 Diabetes research".

In 2019, JDRF International appointed its first-ever CEO and President with Type 1 Diabetes, Dr. Aaron Kowalski. Prior to taking this role, Kowalski served as JDRF's Chief Mission Officer for five years.

Research
In 2018, JDRF provided $85 million (37% of their total income) to T1D scientific research grants; they provided $156.4 million (67% of their total income) in 2008.

Noted philanthropists
Woody Johnson, heir to the Johnson & Johnson fortune
Jack Benaroya
Barbara Davis

See also
Juvenation

References

External links 
 

Diabetes organizations
Charities based in New York City
Organizations established in 1970
1970 establishments in Pennsylvania
Non-profit organizations based in New York City
Health charities in the United States
Medical and health organizations based in New York City